The Berdan rifle (винтовка Бердана/vintovka Berdana in Russian) is a Russian rifle created by the American firearms expert and inventor Hiram Berdan in 1868. It was standard issue in the Russian army from 1870 to 1891, when it was replaced by the Mosin–Nagant rifle. It was widely used in Russia as a hunting weapon, and sporting variants, including shotguns, were produced until the mid-1930s.

The Russian Berdan I (M1868) and Berdan II (M1870) rifles of .42 caliber are distinct from the Spanish Berdan 15mm (.58+ cal) conversion rifles adopted by Spain as the M1857/67 Berdan (and related engineer, artillery & short rifles).

Berdan I
Two different versions of the later single-shot Berdan rifle were adopted as service weapons by Imperial Russia. The first version, manufactured by Colt in the US, is known as model 1868, or Berdan I. It is a hammerless "trapdoor" breechblock design, and was manufactured in limited numbers (the contract stipulated 30,000) as a full-length infantry rifle. Colt also manufactured a few half-stock Berdan I cavalry carbine prototypes, but these were never adopted for Russian service. Colt even produced a few target rifles based on the Berdan I.

Berdan II
The model 1870, or  Berdan II, is a single-shot bolt-action with a distinctive short, pear-shaped bolt handle. The bolt handle serves as the only locking lug for the action, and when closed, points upwards at a 30-degree angle, rather than horizontally. The Berdan II was produced in four variants: an infantry rifle, the lighter and slightly shorter dragoon rifle, a Cossack rifle with a button trigger and no trigger guard, and a cavalry carbine. Infantry and dragoon rifles were issued with quadrangular socket bayonets. Initial production of the Berdan II was at Birmingham Small Arms in England. The rifles were later manufactured in large numbers by Russian factories at Tula, Izhevsk, and Sestroretsk. Estimated total production of all models is over 3 million. The rifle was known for its accuracy, simplicity and reliability.

Cartridge
The 10.7×58mmR cartridge used in the Berdan was also invented by Hiram Berdan, with the assistance of Russian colonel . It was the subject of many patents in both the United States and United Kingdom. The bottleneck cartridge case used the Berdan primer, its first use in a small arms cartridge. Cartridges were issued in blue paper packets of six rounds each. In addition to the regular cartridge for rifles, a special cartridge was manufactured for use in the cavalry carbine. It consisted of the same cartridge case and bullet, but with a lighter powder charge of only 4.5 grams, and was issued in six round pink paper packets. At the time of its use, the 10.75×58mmR (4.2 line) cartridge was known for its power and accuracy.

Later usage
No magazine-fed versions of the Berdan ever progressed beyond the prototype phase. Russian troops, however, did have various cartridge holders, such as the Krnka quick-loader, attached to their rifles to aid in reloading. By the late 1880s Russia began the process of replacing the Berdan with a high velocity and magazine fed rifle, and this resulted in the adoption of the Mosin–Nagant. In 1892, a batch of 3,004 Berdan II rifles were converted to 7.62×54mmR for Russian service by arms makers in Belgium. These rifles have new barrels and sights, and new bolts with a front locking lug and longer bolt handle. Had the conversion been deemed fit for service, an additional 40,000 were to be converted. However this did not go through.

Sporting rifles and shotguns were re-manufactured in Russia from surplus rifles after the Mosin–Nagant was adopted into service.

Markings
Markings on the Berdan rifle usually consist of the Imperial Russian double-headed eagle cypher on the top receiver flat. The manufacturer's name in Cyrillic, date of manufacture, and rifle serial number, are on the top of the barrel. Some rifles also show a date of manufacture on the receiver. The serial number was also applied to the bolt. Additional proof marks and property markings are found on the receiver and barrel. There is a factory cartouche on the right side of the buttstock.

Comparison with contemporary rifles

Users 
 Russian Empire: Both the Berdan I and Berdan II were used by guard units in the Russian Army during the Russo-Turkish War of 1877–78. Russian forces, although ultimately victorious, were badly mauled by the very long range fire from Turk Peabody–Martini rifles during the Siege of Plevna. After the war a long-range auxiliary sight was adopted and retrofitted to the Berdan II infantry rifle. The Berdanka, as it was called, continued on in Russian service even after the adoption of the Mosin–Nagant, primarily with reserve and rear echelon units when the Mosin-Nagant became plentiful. Many Russian troops had Berdan rifles in the Russo-Japanese War of 1905. During World War I, some Russian second line, training and service units were armed with the Berdan II. It is common to see Berdan rifles in photos of street fighting taken during the Russian Revolution of 1917.
 : The Russian Empire sent 30,000 Berdan rifles to Ethiopia before the First Italo-Ethiopian War. Some were hand-modified into carbines 
  Kingdom of Bulgaria: Berdan II was adopted by Bulgarian army
  Kingdom of Serbia in 1890 received 76,000 rifles as military aid. They saw service in the Balkan Wars and the First World War in the hands of Serbian soldiers of the 3rd class (men over 50 years old).
 : received about 7,000 Berdan rifles from the Russian Empire

The Swiss military bought 8900 in 1869, but these were replaced in favour of the Vetterli soon after.
The Berdan II saw service, though by then very limited, in Finland as late as World War II. In the Finnish Civil War of 1918, troops stationed in Finland still had Berdan rifles in storage and some 2nd line troops continued to employ the Berdan II. During this conflict, newer rifles were not always available in needed numbers, so Berdans saw limited use on both sides.  As the Finnish military was not interested in the obsolete Berdan, in 1919 some 2,500 were issued to the Suojeluskunta (National Guard) General HQ. When the Suojeluskunta obtained modern rifles, the Berdans were returned to Finnish Army stores. About 3,000 Berdan rifles were issued to Finnish troops during the initial stages of the 1939 Winter War due to the great lack of modern infantry weapons. These rifles were replaced by more modern rifles as soon as it was possible. It appears that the Finns retained the Berdan rifles in store until scrapping them starting in 1945. In 1955 the remaining 1,029 were sold abroad, mostly in the U.S., through surplus arms dealers.

See also
Berdan Sharps rifle
List of Russian weaponry
Table of handgun and rifle cartridges

References

External links

7.62×54mmR rifles
Single-shot bolt-action rifles
Early rifles
Rifles of the United States
Rifles of the Russian Empire
Russo-Japanese war weapons of Russia
Hinged breechblock rifles